The Miss Alaska's Teen competition is the pageant that selects the representative for Alaska in the Miss America's Teen pageant.

Jasmine Frederick of Eagle River was crowned Miss Alaska's Outstanding Teen on June 16, 2022 at the Performing Arts Center in Anchorage, Alaska. She competed in the Miss America's Outstanding Teen 2023 pageant at the Hyatt Regency Dallas in Dallas, Texas, on August 12, 2022.

In January of 2023, the official name of the pageant was changed from Miss Alaska’s Outstanding Teen, to Miss Alaska’s Teen, in accordance with the national pageant.

Gallery of previous titleholders

Winners

References

External links
 Official website

Alaska
Alaska culture
Women in Alaska
Annual events in Alaska